Davis Farm or Davis Farmstead or Davis Barn may refer to:

in the United States (by state)
Davis Barn (Pleasant Grove, Arkansas), listed on the NRHP in Stone County, Arkansas
Robert Davis Farmhouse, Millsboro, Delaware, listed on the NRHP in Sussex County, Delaware
E. M. Davis Farm, Shelbyville, Kentucky, listed on the NRHP in Shelby County, Kentucky
Brown-Davis-Frost Farm, Jefferson, Massachusetts, listed on the NRHP in Worcester County, Massachusetts
Phineas Davis Farmstead, Mexico, New York, listed on the NRHP in Oswego County, New York
James Davis Farm, Dublin, Ohio, listed on the NRHP in Franklin County, Ohio
James Davis Barn, Dublin, Ohio, listed on the NRHP in Franklin County, Ohio
John and Magdalena Davis Farm, Oregon City, Oregon, listed on the NRHP in Clackamas County, Oregon
Daniel Davis House and Barn, Birmingham, Pennsylvania, listed on the NRHP in southern Chester County, Pennsylvania
David Davis Farm, New Holland, Pennsylvania, listed on the NRHP in Lancaster County, Pennsylvania
Davis-Ercanbrack Farmstead, Orem, Utah, listed on the NRHP in Utah County, Utah
Cyrus Davis Farmstead, Menomonee Falls, Wisconsin, listed on the NRHP in Waukesha County, Wisconsin
Cyrus Davis-Davis Brothers Farmhouse, Menomonee Falls, Wisconsin, listed on the NRHP in Waukesha County, Wisconsin

See also
Davis House (disambiguation)